Viviane "Vivi" Holzel Domingues (born 15 September 1989) is a Brazilian footballer who plays as a goalkeeper.

Career
Born in São Paulo, Vivi began her career with hometown side Corinthians in 2008. She subsequently played for Foz Cataratas, Centro Olímpico and São Caetano before moving abroad for the 2014 season, with Norwegian side Avaldsnes IL.

Vivi returned to Brazil in 2016 with São José, and represented Audax before moving to Icelandic side Grindavík in 2017. She returned to Audax in 2018, and signed for Palmeiras ahead of the 2019 season.

On 6 February 2021, Vivi was announced as the new signing of Internacional. Roughly one year later, she was presented at Santos.

Honours
Foz Cataratas
Campeonato Paranaense de Futebol Feminino: 2010

Internacional
Campeonato Gaúcho de Futebol Feminino: 2021

References

External links

1989 births
Living people
Footballers from São Paulo
Brazilian women's footballers
Women's association football goalkeepers
Campeonato Brasileiro de Futebol Feminino Série A1 players
Sociedade Esportiva Palmeiras (women) players
Santos FC (women) players
Toppserien players
Avaldsnes IL players
Grindavík women's football players
Brazilian expatriate women's footballers
Brazilian expatriate sportspeople in Norway
Brazilian expatriate sportspeople in Iceland
Expatriate women's footballers in Norway
Expatriate women's footballers in Iceland
Sport Club Internacional (women) players